A Driven Right Leg circuit or DRL circuit, also known as Right Leg Driving technique, is an electric circuit that is often added to biological signal amplifiers to reduce common-mode interference. Biological signal amplifiers such as ECG (electrocardiogram) EEG (electroencephalogram) or EMG circuits measure very small electrical signals emitted by the body, often as small as several micro-volts (millionths of a volt). However, the patient's body can also act as an antenna which picks up electromagnetic interference, especially 50/60 Hz noise from electrical power lines. This interference can obscure the biological signals, making them very hard to measure. Right leg driver circuitry is used to eliminate interference noise by actively cancelling the interference.

Other methods of noise control include:
 Faraday cage
 Twisting Wires
 High Gain Instrumentation Amplifier
 Filtering

Further reading 
 J.G. Webster, "Medical Instrumentation", 3rd ed, New York: John Wiley & Sons, 1998, . 
 B. B. Winter and J. G. Webster, “Driven-right-leg circuit design,” IEEE Trans. Biomed. Eng., vol. BME-30, no. 1, pp. 62–66, Jan. 1983.
 "Improving Common-Mode Rejection Using the Right-Leg Drive Amplifier" by Texas Instruments.
Electronic design
Analog circuits